Trigonoptera spilonota is a species of beetle in the family Cerambycidae. It was described by Gestro in 1876, originally under the genus Arsysia. It is known from Papua New Guinea and Indonesia.

Subspecies
 Trigonoptera spilonota spilonota (Gestro, 1876)
 Trigonoptera spilonota albonotata Gahan, 1915

References

Tmesisternini
Beetles described in 1876